Smile, Mom is a 2010 South Korean television drama starring Lee Mi-sook, Park Won-sook, Ji Soo-won, Yoon Jung-hee, Ko Eun-mi and Lee Jae-hwang. The weekend theater drama aired on SBS from November 6, 2010 to April 24, 2011 on Saturdays and Sundays at 20:50 for 50 episodes.

Plot
Smile Mom covers the reconciliation and love stories of 3 pairs of mothers and daughters.

Jo Bok-hee (Lee Mi-sook) is the mother of three children Shin Dal-rae (Kang Min-kyung), Shin Meo-roo (Lee Jae-hwang) and Shin So-ra (Jung Ji-ahn). For their own well being, Jo Bok-hee pushes them hard to succeed. Shin Dal-rae is a top talent and since she was a young child, she has been dragged to broadcasting companies for auditions. Because of her shy and introverted personality, Shin Dal-rae hates to be in front of the camera, but after her mother and father fought over money, Shin Dal-rae has just followed her mother's will. Shin Meo-roo is Jo Bok-hee's first son and is married to Kang Shin-young (Yoon Jung-hee). He has a bad habit of being a womanizer. Growing up under the strong will of his mother, Shin Meo-roo has also become a bit of a mama's boy. He is popular and thought to be kind, but he is not responsible and double-faced.

Park Soon-ja (Park Won-sook) is the mother of Kang Shin-young and Kang Do-young. Under her husband's patriarchal attitude, she raised her children and also took care of her parents-in-law and husband. Kang Shin-young assists her husband Shin Meo-roo, who is a politician. She even writes his draft speeches on his behalf. To promote her husband's kind image she showcases her life to the public. Older brother Kang Do-young (Seo Dong-won) is incompetent, troubled, and vain.

Yoon Min-joo (Ji Soo-won) is the mother of Bae Yeon-woo (Kim Jin-woo) and Bae Yeon-seo (Yeo Min-joo). She was dumped by her husband and raised her two kids alone. Even as a single mother she was able to become a professor. Yoon Min-joo is close friends with Jo Bok-hee. Nevertheless, because Yoon Min-joo was dumped by her husband she has gained a twisted mind. Her son Bae Yeon-woo is the society reporter for a newspaper. His character is cynical, critical and rough. Because of his father, he is indifferent to his mother, hates his family and does not want to marry. Daughter Bae Yeon-seo constantly defies her mother so there's always conflict between the two.

Cast
Mothers
Lee Mi-sook as Jo Bok-hee
Park Won-sook as Park Soon-ja
Ji Soo-won as Yoon Min-joo
Im Ye-jin as Kang Seo-poong

Children
Yoon Jung-hee as Kang Shin-young
Ko Eun-mi as Hwang Bo-mi
Lee Jae-hwang as Shin Meo-roo

Shin family
Kang Min-kyung as Shin Dal-rae 
Jeon Min-seo as young Dal-rae
Jung Ji-ahn as Shin So-ra
Kim Yong-gun as Shin Ki-bong
Kang Ye-seo as Shin Yoo-ra (Meo-roo and Shin-young's daughter)

Kang family
Yoon Joo-sang as Kang Dong-poong
Seo Dong-won as Kang Do-young
Hwang Bo-ra as Kim Mi-so (Do-young's wife)

Bae family
Kim Jin-woo as Bae Yeon-woo
Yeo Min-joo as Bae Yeon-seo

Extended cast
Park Sung-min as Goo Hyun-se
Seo Jun-young as Lee Kang-so
Choi Sung-ho as drama PD
Jung Han-hun as Park Eui-won
Won Jong-rye as Eui-won's wife
Jung Chan as Choi Jung-won
Lee Mi-eun as Hye-ryun
Lee Hyun-kyung as Kang-so's sister
Kim Gyu-jin

Guest appearance
Seo Ji-young 
Chung Lim 
Bae Geu-rin as Baek Jang-mi
Kim In-suk
Lee Do-yeop as Yoom Min-joo's ex-husband

See also
Seoul Broadcasting System

References

External links
Smile, Mom official SBS website 

Seoul Broadcasting System television dramas
2010 South Korean television series debuts
2011 South Korean television series endings
Korean-language television shows
South Korean romance television series
Television shows written by Kim Soon-ok